Fernando Brandão (born 22 January 1983, Belo Horizonte, Brazil) is a Brazilian physicist and computer scientist working on quantum information and quantum computation. He is currently the Bren Professor of Theoretical Physics at the California Institute of Technology and Director of Quantum Applications at Amazon Web Services. Previously, he was a researcher at Microsoft and a reader in Computer Science at University College London.

He is an editor of the journal Physics Reports. He was awarded the 2013 European Quantum Information Young Investigator Award for "his highly appraised achievements in entanglement theory, quantum complexity theory, and quantum many-body physics, which combine dazzling mathematical ability and impressive physical insight". He was awarded the 2020 American Physical Society Rolf Landauer and Charles H. Bennett award for his contributions to entanglement theory.

References

External links 
 Academic page 
  Personal website
CV
Google Scholar page

Brazilian physicists
California Institute of Technology faculty
Quantum physicists
1983 births
Living people